Bert Graham (April 3, 1886 – June 19, 1971), known by his initials "B. G.", was a Major League Baseball first baseman and second baseman who played in eight games with the  St. Louis Browns.

External links

1886 births
1971 deaths
Major League Baseball first basemen
Major League Baseball second basemen
Baseball players from Illinois
St. Louis Browns players
Muskogee Navigators players
Bartlesville Boosters players
Jackson Tigers players
Montgomery Billikens players
Columbus Discoverers players
Danville Speakers players
Davenport Blue Sox players
Aberdeen Black Cats players
Dallas Giants players
Waco Navigators players
People from Vermilion County, Illinois